The presence of Algerians in Italy dates back to the 1980s.

Numbers
As of 2019, in Italy, there are 19,661 regular immigrants from Algeria. The three cities with most number of Algerians are: Naples, Rome and Milan.

Notable Algerians in Italy

 Matteo Ferrari (1979), footballer
 Samir Lacheheb (1988), footballer
 Faouzi Ghoulam (1991), footballer
 Saphir Taïder (1992),  footballer
 Mohamed Salim Fares (1996), footballer
Tahar Lamri (1958), writer
Amara Lakhous (1970), writer and anthropologist 
Luca Guadagnino (1971), filmmaker born to an Italian father and an Algerian mother

See also
 Arabs in Italy
 Algerian Americans
 Algerian Canadians
 Algerians in the United Kingdom
 Algerians in France
 Algerians in Belgium
 Algerians in the Netherlands
 Algerians in Germany
 Algerians in Switzerland
 Algerians in Norway
 Algerians in Sweden
 Algerian Australians

References

African diaspora in Italy
Ethnic groups in Italy
Muslim communities in Europe